Josef Deutschmann (6 December 1920 – 7 April 1997) was an Austrian cross-country skier who competed in the 1948 Winter Olympics. He was born in Bruck an der Mur. In 1948 he was a member of the Austrian relay team which finished fourth in the 4x10 km relay competition. In the 18 km event he finished 46th. He died in Kapfenberg in 1997.

External links
Josef Deutschmann's profile at Sports Reference.com
 

1920 births
1997 deaths
Austrian male cross-country skiers
Olympic cross-country skiers of Austria
Cross-country skiers at the 1948 Winter Olympics
People from Bruck an der Mur
Sportspeople from Styria